Charles Carney may refer to:

 Charles J. Carney (1913–1987), U.S. Representative from Ohio
 Charles Carney (Jacobite), Irish Jacobite
 Chuck Carney (1900–1984), American football and basketball player